Rajendra Shah (1950 – 28 September 2018) was an Indian cricketer. He played in five first-class cricket matches for Saurashtra in the Ranji Trophy between 1971 and 1976.

See also
 List of Saurashtra cricketers

References

External links
 

1950 births
2018 deaths
Indian cricketers
Saurashtra cricketers
Place of birth missing